The Jahra Hospital is the main public general hospital in the Jahra Governorate, Kuwait. It was first opened in 1981.

New Jahra Hospital 
A new integrated hospital was built next to Al-Jahra Hospital, to be a medical city serving the residents of the governorate. The medical city extends over an area of 235,000 square meters with a total building area of 724,000 square meters and contains four towers for patient rooms, one of the largest central laboratories, the largest maternity center for gynecology, and the largest accident and emergency department in Country. It has 1,903 beds and was first opened in 2018.

References

Hospitals in Kuwait
Hospitals established in 2018
Hospitals established in 1981
1981 establishments in Kuwait
2018 establishments in Kuwait